Sarah Brightman in Concert was a 2009 concert tour by the British classical crossover singer Sarah Brightman throughout Latin America.

After The Symphony World Tour, Brightman started another world tour in October 2009, visiting first Mexico closing Festival Internacional de Chihuahua (Chihuahua International Festival) in Benito Juarez Olympic Stadium. Then continued through Latin America with totally sold-out venues in 7 countries, and ending in UNESCO World Heritage Site Chichen Itza, Mexico, where she was accompanied by the Symphony Orchestra of Yucatán under the direction of Paul Bateman, with tenor Erkan Aki and countertenor Fernando Lima.

Set list

Act I

Intro: Sanvean Instrumental
 Gothica / Fleurs Du Mal
 Symphony
 It's a Beautiful Day (Contains elements from "Un Bel Di Vedremo")

Interlude: Forbidden Colours Instrumental
 What a Wonderful World
 Dust in the Wind
 Who Wants to Live Forever
 Hijo de la Luna
 La Luna

Interlude: Sarahbande Instrumental
 Anytime, Anywhere
 Nella Fantasia
 Canto della Terra  (with Erkan Aki)
 Sarai Qui  (with Erkan Aki)
 Nessun dorma 

Act II

 Harem
 Stranger in Paradise

Interlude: Billitis Générique  Instrumental
 Scarborough Fair
 He Doesn't See Me
 A Whiter Shade of Pale
 Pasión (with Fernando Lima)
 Ave Maria (with Fernando Lima)
 Wishing You Were Somehow Here Again
 The Phantom of the Opera (with Erkan Aki)
 Time to Say Goodbye

Encore
 Deliver Me
 A Question of Honour

Tour dates

References

2009 concert tours
Sarah Brightman concert tours